The 1969 La Flèche Wallonne was the 33rd edition of La Flèche Wallonne cycle race and was held on 20 April 1969. The race started in Liège and finished in Marcinelle. The race was won by Jos Huysmans of the Dr. Mann team.

General classification

References

1969 in road cycling
1969
1969 in Belgian sport
1969 Super Prestige Pernod